Harsch is a surname. Notable people with the surname include:

Anne-Sophie Harsch (born 1999), Luxembourgian racing cyclist
Eddie Harsch (1957–2016), Canadian keyboardist
Joseph C. Harsch (1905–1998), American newspaper, radio, and television journalist
Klaudius Harsch (born 2001), German curler